is a Japanese manga written and illustrated by Rin Asano. The manga was licensed in the US by ADV Manga. As of March 2007, Mag Garden has released 7 bound volumes of the manga.

Volume listing

Reception
Mania.com's Mike Dungan described the manga as "a very enjoyable story that is equal parts action, horror, fantasy, science fiction, historical drama, and comedy." He commended the manga's characterisation, stating there was an "air of confidence in both the art and the storytelling".

References

External links

ADV Manga
Shōnen manga
2002 manga
Horror anime and manga
Supernatural anime and manga
Mag Garden manga